Aaronsohnia is a genus in the family Asteraceae, native to mainly non-salty steppes and deserts in North Africa and Middle East. It was named in 1927 after the agronomist Aaron Aaronsohn by the botanists Otto Warburg (1859–1938) and Alexander Eig (1894–1938).

Species and subspecies

, Plants of the World online has 2 accepted species:
 Aaronsohnia factorovskyi  
 Aaronsohnia pubescens  (basionym : Cotula pubescens )
A. pubescens subsp. pubescens
A. pubescens subsp. maroccana

References

Bibliography

External links
African flowering plants database
Photo of Aaronsohnia factorovskyi
Photo of Aaronsohnia pubescens
Chemical Composition and Antifungal Activity of Aaronsohnia pubescens Essential Oil from Algeria

Flora of North Africa
Anthemideae
Asteraceae genera
Taxa named by Otto Warburg